The East Branch Chandler River is a  tributary of the Chandler River in Washington County, Maine. It flows west from its source in Jonesboro, to its mouth in Centerville.

See also
List of rivers of Maine

References

Maine Streamflow Data from the USGS
Maine Watershed Data From Environmental Protection Agency

Rivers of Washington County, Maine
Rivers of Maine